Swartz Nunataks are two prominent nunataks, 1,565 m, protruding through the ice midway between the north part of Worcester Range and Tate Peak. Named by Advisory Committee on Antarctic Names (US-ACAN) in 1964 for Lieutenant Philip K. Swartz, Jr., MC, U.S. Navy, officer in charge of the South Pole Station in 1961.

Nunataks of the Ross Dependency
Hillary Coast